The black-and-rufous swallow (Hirundo nigrorufa) is a species of bird in the family Hirundinidae.

Range
It inhabits the miombo ecosystems of Angola, Democratic Republic of the Congo and Zambia.

References

black-and-rufous swallow
Birds of Central Africa
black-and-rufous swallow
Taxonomy articles created by Polbot